Saint-Étienne-du-Bois is a commune in the Ain department, eastern France.

Geography
The Sevron forms part of the commune's eastern border then flows northwest through the commune.

Climate
Saint-Étienne-du-Bois has a oceanic climate (Köppen climate classification Cfb).

Population

See also
Communes of the Ain department

References

Communes of Ain
Ain communes articles needing translation from French Wikipedia